Hellblazer, also known as John Constantine, Hellblazer, is an American comic book series starring John Constantine. The character, created by Alan Moore, Stephen R. Bissette, and John Totleben first appeared in Swamp Thing (vol. 2) #37 (June 1985) as a supporting character, and later appeared as the protagonist of his own series in 1988. In 1993, the series started being published under DC's newly founded imprint Vertigo, and by its cancellation it was the imprint's longest-running series.

Hellblazer has been incompletely collected into many trade paperbacks. The first UK editions, printed by Titan Books, reprinted the original colour issues in black and white. Though subsequent editions were in color, they were not numbered and not always released chronologically. While some issues were never collected in trade form, some early issues appear in books. Starting in April 2011, Vertigo began republishing the series in new numbered editions, collecting the series in proper chronological order and including issues that had been left out of earlier editions. The new editions also include short stories, prose pieces, original graphic novels, related mini-series, and crossover issues from other series, most commonly Swamp Thing.

Comic book series 

John Constantine first starred in his own solo series Hellblazer in 1988, which ran until its cancellation in 2013. The character was then introduced into the main DC continuity with the fourth wave of the New 52 releases in Constantine, which featured a younger version of the character with a new backstory, and ran until 2015. It was relaunched as Constantine: The Hellblazer under a new creative team which attempted to bring back to "the core tenets of [Constantine's] character", running for thirteen issues. The series was once again cancelled and relaunched to coincide with the release of DC Rebirth, including an introduction one-shot titled The Hellblazer: Rebirth, and running for twenty-four issues. This series brought back elements from the original series, while still being rated PG-13. In July 2019, it was announced that a new series would be released under The Sandman Universe line, published under Vertigo's successor imprint DC Black Label, starting with a new one-shot titled The Sandman Presents: Hellblazer. The series was cancelled with issue twelve.

Ongoing series

Limited series

One-shots

Other stories

Graphic novels

Collected editions 
All collected editions were released in trade paperback format, unless noted otherwise.

Hellblazer 
Originally the series was collected irregularly. These volumes are preceded by volumes 3–7 of Swamp Thing.

New editions 
In 2011, Vertigo started reprinting the series in new, numbered trade paperbacks in chronological order.

Constantine

Constantine: The Hellblazer

The Hellblazer

John Constantine: Hellblazer 
Published under DC Black Label.

Limited series

Other collections 
Constantine is found in most Swamp Thing collections from volume 3, The Curse. He appears in every subsequent volume of the 1985 series and in volume 1, Bad Seed, of the 2004 series.

Novels 
Author John Shirley has written three Hellblazer-related novels: a novelisation of the film Constantine, released in 2005, War Lord, and Subterranean, a pair of original novels based around the Constantine seen in the comics, both of which were released in 2006.

External links 

 Hellblazer at Comic Vine
 Hellblazer at the Grand Comics Database

References 

Hellblazer
Publications